Benthobia is a genus of sea snails, marine gastropod mollusks in the family Benthobiidae .

Species
Species within the genus Benthobia include:
 Benthobia atafona Simone, 2003
 Benthobia complexirhyna Simone, 2003
 Benthobia sima Simone, 2003
 Benthobia tornatilis Simone, 2003
 Benthobia tryonii Dall, 1889

References

  Vermeij G. (1998). Generic revision of the neogastropod family Pseudolividae. The Nautilus 111(2): 53-84,
 Simone L. (2003). Revision of the genus Benthobia (Caenogastropoda, Pseudolividae). Journal of Molluscan Studies 69(3):245-262

Benthobiidae
Gastropod genera